Winiges (or Winichis) (contemporary) (died 822) was the Duke of Spoleto (dux Spolitanus) from 789 to his death. He was probably a Lombard in the entourage of Charlemagne when he was sent in 788 to lead Hildeprand of Spoleto and Grimoald III of Benevento in cooperation with Frankish troops against a Byzantine invasion.

In this, his first recorded action, he was successful, defeating the Greeks led by Theodoros in Apulia. Hildeprand, however, died on the campaign and Charlemagne appointed Winiges to succeed him in the Duchy of Spoleto.

Winiges was appointed by Charlemagne to act as his missus dominicus in the Ducatus Romae and he was at Saint Peter's Basilica when Pope Leo III was assaulted on 25 April 799. It was then he who brought him to shelter in Spoleto until he could safely return to Rome.

Winiges got involved in a war with Grimoald of Benevento, however, and was captured while being besieged at Lucera in 802. He was held captive for a year before being released in 803.

While Leo III was nearing death in 815, the Roman citizens revolted, but King Bernard sent Winiges to Rome to quell the unrest.

In 822, Winiges abdicated his worldly office and retired to a monastery, where he died not too long after (probably that same year). His successor was Suppo I, Brixiæ civitatis comes ("Count of the city of Brescia").

References

Sources
Hodgkin, Thomas. Italy and her Invaders. Clarendon Press: 1895.
Medieval Lands Project: Northern Italy — Spoleto.

8th-century dukes of Spoleto
9th-century dukes of Spoleto
9th-century Lombard people
Frankish warriors
Lombard warriors
8th-century Frankish nobility
8th-century births
822 deaths

Year of birth unknown